Eurhythma latifasciella is a moth in the family Crambidae. It was described by Turner in 1904. It is found in Australia.

References

Crambinae
Moths described in 1904